Hindu College (Guntur) was founded in 1930. It is located in Guntur City, India.

Introduction

This educational institution started its activities in 1930. The current Hindu high school started then. later it started offering other courses also. It offers graduate and under-graduate courses. It has a Pharma College campus and a P.G. college on the Amaravathi Road which are recognized by the Acharya Nagarjuna University, Guntur.

History 
The main city campus was established in 1930. Later the campus for the College of Pharmacy was started in the suburban area of the city. This is one of the oldest colleges in A.P. Hindu college has P.G. courses separately in Amaravathi Road which is 3 km from the main campus. The Hindu College was founded in 1930 with Late Sri Kompalli Kotilingam as founder President and Late Sri Aka Lakshmi Narasimham as founder Secretary, both leading lawyers of that time in the city. Sri Aka Lakshmi Narasimham took the idea of setting up a higher educational institute onto his shoulders for people of Hindu community upon the advice of his classmate and close friend, the ex-president of India, Sri Sarvepalli Radhakrishna. Later eminent persons of the Guntur city joined this campaign and established this institution which came into limelight and produced an enormous number of intellectuals to the country.

Departments
 Courses: Masters and Bachelors in Arts, Science, Mathematics, Management, Pharmaceuticals, Electronics.
 Separate department for National Cadet Corps) 25(A) Battalion and 2 (Armed).
 The Fine Arts department allows the student to participate in cultural activities, essay writing and drawing. The college participates in inter college competitions in Nagarjuna University and got a best college prize in 2003. 
 B.Sc Computer Science is the main course degree of the college.

Sister Institutions:

Hindu College of Pharmacy
B.H.H. Junior college for Girls
B.H.H. Degree College for women
Hindu College High School
Pattabhipuram High School
Sri Majety Guravaiah High School
Sri Majety Guravaiah Junior College
Sri Majety Guravaiah Degree College

Infrastructural facilities in the College

Main Campus of about 1,15,000 Sq.Ft. built area and open land, totaling 7.5 acres (approx.)
P.G. Campus of about 60,000 Sq.Ft of built up area and open land, totaling 8 acres(approx.)
Vacant Land for further development, of about 20.00 acres
Auditorium -Sri Aka Danadaiah Pantulu Hall
Seminar Hall
Agricultural Farm
Andhra Bank- Campus Branch
Canteen
Health Center With regular O.P. facility
Facility for Indoor games and Gymnasium
Acharya Nagarjuna University Distance Education Centre for U.G. and P.G.
Latest Communication Network like Computers, FAX, E-Mail and Internet facility.
Support Services:

Central Library
Computer Center
Sports facility
Welfare Schemes
Grievance Redressal cell
Vehicle placing shed etc. The College is endowed with a unique museum of geology (One and only big Museum of Geology in Entire Andhra Pradesh) in the Department of Geological sciences offers B.Sc. course in combination with other basic sciences.

References

External links

Colleges in Guntur
Educational institutions established in 1930
1930 establishments in India
Colleges in Andhra Pradesh
Hindu universities and colleges